The 1944 Vanderbilt Commodores football team represented Vanderbilt University during the 1944 college football season.

Schedule

References

Vanderbilt
Vanderbilt Commodores football seasons
College football undefeated seasons
Vanderbilt Commodores football